The Gloucester dory is a variant of the Banks dory, a type of narrow-bottomed, slab-sided boat, common in the North Eastern United States.  It is characteristically smaller and lighter, with less overhang, both bow and stern, and less freeboard.  It retains the Banks dory's slab sides.  Gloucester dories were designed to be launched through the surf behind a breakwater for daily fishing and lobstering off the Massachusetts shore.  

Because of its simple lines, a Gloucester dory is relatively easy to build.  With the straight sides and flat bottom, stitch and glue techniques work well with this boat.

See also
 Dory
 Swampscott dory

References

Books;
 
 

Boat types
Gloucester, Massachusetts